Brian Sheesley (born April 14, 1967) is an American animation director who has worked on several comedy shows, including directing duties on The Grim Adventures of Billy & Mandy, two episodes of The Critic, nine episodes of Futurama and two episodes of King of the Hill.  Sheesley also worked as an animation timer on Rugrats Go Wild in 2003 and as an animator on A Wish for Wings That Work in 1991. In his earlier career Brian worked as a layout artist on The Ren & Stimpy Show. Brian was an animation director and supervising director on Camp Lazlo, and recently an animation director on Regular Show, Sym-Bionic Titan and Uncle Grandpa. He studied in the Character Animation program at the California Institute of the Arts. 
He also worked on The Simpsons in 1996, as an animation timer.

Directing credits

The Critic episodes
"Eyes on the Prize"
"Sherman of Arabia"

King of the Hill episodes 
 Westie Side Story
 How I Learned to Stop Worrying and Love the Alamo

Futurama episodes 
"Love's Labours Lost in Space"
"When Aliens Attack"
"Why Must I Be a Crustacean in Love?"
"Mother's Day"
"Amazon Women in the Mood"
"Love and Rocket"
"Future Stock"
"The Route of All Evil"
"The Sting"

Other projects
Mighty Mouse: The New Adventures
Klutter!
Zoot Rumpus (pilot)
The Grim Adventures of Billy & Mandy 
Fanboy & Chum Chum
Dan Vs.
Sym-Bionic Titan
Regular Show
Uncle Grandpa
Danger & Eggs

References

External links
 

Living people
California Institute of the Arts alumni
American animators
American television directors
American animated film directors
Primetime Emmy Award winners
1967 births